is a Japanese professional tennis player who specializes in doubles.

Aoyama turned professional after graduating from Waseda University. She reached a career-high singles ranking of world No. 182, on 9 February 2015, and a doubles ranking of world No. 4, on 28 February 2022. She plays predominantly in doubles and has won 17 titles on the WTA Tour, having had her most successful Grand Slam appearances at the 2023 Australian Open final and at Wimbledon, reaching the semifinals at the 2013 and 2021 tournaments. She has also won four singles and 30 doubles titles on the ITF Women's Circuit.

Personal life and background
Aoyama started playing tennis at age 9. Her favorite surface is grass. She studied at Waseda University in Japan.

Professional career

2007–12: First steps, first WTA title in doubles
Aoyama made her ITF Women's Circuit debut in the doubles event at Gifu in 2007. In March 2009, she won her first ITF title at the $10k Kōfu doubles event. In June 2010, she won her first singles ITF title at the $10k Tokyo event. In October 2010 at the Japan Women's Open, she made her debut at a WTA Tour main-draw event. She failed to qualify in singles and had more success in doubles, reaching her first WTA final. In late November 2010, she won the $75k Toyota doubles event. In June 2011, she made her WTA Tour singles debut at the Birmingham Classic as a qualifier. At the 2011 Wimbledon, she made her Grand Slam debut in doubles. At the 2012 Washington Open, she won her first WTA title in doubles. In September 2012 she won the $100k Ningbo Challenger. During the 2012 season, she also won two $50k events, the Lexington Challenger and the Bronx Open.

2013–16: More success in doubles, Wimbledon semifinalist
As time passed, Aoyama became mainly a doubles player, playing in doubles events preferentially to singles. She made a strong start into the 2013 season reaching the semifinal in the first week of January at the Shenzhen Open. Soon after, she won her first Grand Slam match at the Australian Open, but then lost in the second round playing with Irina Falconi. In March, she won the Malaysian Open with Chang Kai-chen. She also had a strong start into the grass-court season, reaching the semifinals at the Rosmalen Championships. She achieved more success at Wimbledon, when she and Chanelle Scheepers reached semifinals. This was her first significant Grand Slam result. In the semifinal match, they lost to Hsieh Su-wei and Peng Shuai. In September, she won the Washington Open for the second year in a row. At the end of the year, she reached semifinals of the Korea Open and won the Toyota World Challenge.  

During the next three seasons she did not have as good performances as in the 2013 season. In 2014, in singles, her only significant result came at the end of the year, when she reached the final of the Toyota World Challenge but lost to An-Sophie Mestach. In doubles, she won the Washington Open for the third year in a row, and later in October, she won the Japan Women's Open. During the year, she also had success on the ITF Women's Circuit. In May, she won the $50k Fukuoka with Eri Hozumi, and later finished as runner-up at both the $50k event in Lexington and the $75k Toyota World Challenge. In the first week of the 2015 season, she reached the final at the Auckland Open with Renata Voráčová, they lost to Sara Errani and Roberta Vinci. A month later, she reached the final of the Thailand Open with Tamarine Tanasugarn. She then did not have significant results until September, before she reached semifinals at the Korea Open, and later winning two $100k events, in Nanjing and Tokyo. During 2016, she won one WTA doubles title at the Japan Women's Open, and finished runner-up at the Nuremberg Cup, Washington Open and Jiangxi International Open. She also won three $50k events, in Quanzhou, Shenzen and Wuhan.

2019–20: New partnership, French Open quarterfinalist
She reached the 2020 French Open quarterfinals, partnering compatriot Ena Shibahara.

2021: Miami Open & four more titles, Olympics & top 5 debut, WTA Finals semifinalist
She reached the 2021 WTA Finals semifinals, also partnering Ena Shibahara.

2022: World No. 4, Australian Open semifinal
Aoyama continued the partnership with Shibihara for the tournaments at the beginning of the year in Australia. At the Australian Open, they improved on their quarterfinal result the previous year by reaching the semifinal. Following this result, Aoyama reached her highest doubles ranking of world No. 4, on 28 February 2022.

For the three other majors during the year Aoyama partnered with Chan Hao-ching, reaching the quarterfinal stage at Wimbledon, and the third round at the US Open (losing to the eventual winners Krejčíková and Siniaková).

Her final competition was at the Billie Jean King Cup where Aoyama partnered with Shibahara once again. They won each of the six doubles matches they played.

2023: Australian Open finalist, 30th WTA final
At the Australian Open, she reached the finals of a major for the fourth time in her career, again with Shibahara. The pair defeated second-seeded pair of Americans Coco Gauff and Jessica Pegula in the semifinal to reach their first major final. However, they were defeated in straight sets by defending champions Krejčíková and Siniaková.

Performance timelines

Only main-draw results in WTA Tour, Grand Slam tournaments, Fed Cup/Billie Jean King Cup and Olympic Games are included in win–loss records.

Doubles
Current after the 2023 Dubai Tennis Championships.

Significant finals

Grand Slam tournaments

Women's doubles: 1 (runner-up)

WTA Elite Trophy

Doubles: 1 (runner–up)

WTA 1000 tournaments

Doubles: 2 (1 title, 1 runner-up)

WTA career finals

Doubles: 30 (17 titles, 13 runner-ups)

ITF Circuit finals

Singles: 9 (4 titles, 5 runner–ups)

Doubles: 39 (30 titles, 9 runner-ups)

Notes

References

External links
 
 
 
 Japan Tennis Association profile 

1987 births
Living people
Japanese female tennis players
Sportspeople from Tokyo
Waseda University alumni
Tennis players at the 2014 Asian Games
Asian Games medalists in tennis
Asian Games bronze medalists for Japan
Medalists at the 2014 Asian Games
Universiade medalists in tennis
Universiade gold medalists for Japan
Universiade silver medalists for Japan
Universiade bronze medalists for Japan
Medalists at the 2009 Summer Universiade
Medalists at the 2011 Summer Universiade
Olympic tennis players of Japan
Tennis players at the 2020 Summer Olympics
20th-century Japanese women
21st-century Japanese women